Sep'o Ch'ŏngnyŏn station is a railway station in Sep'o-ŭp, Sep'o county, Kangwŏn province, North Korea; it is the junction point of the Kangwŏn and Ch'ŏngnyŏn Ich'ŏn lines of the Korean State Railway.

Originally called Sep'o station (Chosŏn'gŭl: 세포역; Hanja: 洗浦駅), the station, along with the rest of the former Kyŏngwŏn Line, was opened by the Chosen Government Railway on 16 August 1914., it received its current name after the establishment of the DPRK.

References

Railway stations in North Korea
Buildings and structures in Kangwon Province
Railway stations opened in 1914
1914 establishments in Korea